Vasilios Karagounis (born 18 January 1994) is a Greek professional footballer who plays as a defensive midfielder for Super League 2 club Kalamata.

Career
Karagounis started his career at Atromitos then moved to Italy for Udinese Primavera, from which Olympiacos bought him in the summer of 2012. For the 2013–14 season, he was loaned to Aris, where he played in 12 games in the Superleague Greece and a Greek Cup match.

The season after, Karagounis agreed to go on loan to Reggina.

On 3 August 2015, Karagounis signed a year contract with AEL Limassol on loan from Olympiacos. The young defender passed the necessary medical tests and the Cypriot club announced his borrowing. On 1 February 2016, he signed a two-and-a-half year contract with Iraklis for an undisclosed fee. On 15 September 2020 he joined Cypriot club Ermis Aradippou, after he was released from Platanias F.C. due to economic problems. On 18 August 2021, he signed with Erovnuli Liga side FC Torpedo Kutaisi.

Personal life
His brother, Thanasis, is also a footballer.

Honours
Torpedo Kutaisi
Georgian Cup: 2022

AEL Limassol
 Cypriot Super Cup: 2015

Olympiacos
 Super League Greece: 2012–13
 Greek Football Cup: 2012–13

References

External links
 
 Footballdatabase Profile

1994 births
Living people
Greek footballers
Greece youth international footballers
Greek expatriate footballers
Super League Greece players
Cypriot First Division players
Atromitos F.C. players
Udinese Calcio players
Olympiacos F.C. players
Aris Thessaloniki F.C. players
AEL Limassol players
Reggina 1914 players
Expatriate footballers in Italy
Expatriate footballers in Cyprus
Expatriate footballers in Georgia (country)
Greek expatriate sportspeople in Italy
Greek expatriate sportspeople in Cyprus
Greek expatriate sportspeople in Georgia (country)
Association football midfielders
Footballers from Lamia (city)